Edward P. Beavens  was an American professional baseball player who played in the National Association as a second baseman for the 1871 Troy Haymakers and 1872 Brooklyn Atlantics.

External links
Baseball Reference.com page

Major League Baseball second basemen
Brooklyn Stars players
Troy Haymakers players
Brooklyn Atlantics players
Baseball players from New York (state)
Sportspeople from Troy, New York
19th-century baseball players
1848 births
Year of death missing